Philip Whitlock is a former English professional squash player.
He is the current squash coach of professional squash player Emily Whitlock, his daughter.

Whitlock was born on 28 February 1962 in Belfast and represented Devon at county level. He reached a world ranking of 8 and competed in the British Open Squash Championships throughout the nineties. He also represented England at international level including being part of the team at the 1993 Men's World Team Squash Championships.

References

English male squash players
1962 births
Living people